Malassezia nana is a fungus that can cause opportunistic infections in animals. It was first isolated from animals in Japan and Brazil. M. nana resembles M. dermatis and M. sympodialis, but is distinguished from these species by its inability to use Kolliphor EL (Sigma) as the sole lipid source and to hydrolyse aesculin. The type strain of M. nana is NUSV 1003T(=CBS 9557T=JCM 12085T).

References

Further reading
Duarte, E. R., J. C. P. Resende, and J. S. Hamdan. "Characterization of Typical and Atypical Malassezia spp. From Cattle and Dog by Random Amplified Polymorphic DNA Analysis." Arq. Inst. Biol., São Paulo 76.2 (2009): 157–164.
Eidi, Samaneh, Ali Reza Khosravi, and Shahram Jamshidi. "A comparison of different kinds of Malassezia species in healthy dogs and dogs with otitis externa and skin lesions." Turk. J. Vet. Anim. Sci 35.5 (2011): 345–350.
Boekhout, Teun, ed. Malassezia and the Skin: Science and Clinical Practice. Springer, 2010.

Basidiomycota
Parasitic fungi
Yeasts
Fungi described in 2004